Mary McDonald may refer to:

 Mary McDonald (composer), American composer
 Mary Frances McDonald (1929–2021), Irish feminist
 Mary Lou McDonald (born 1969), Irish politician

See also 
 Mary Macdonald, British schoolteacher